Georgia Timken Fry ( – ) was an American painter and heiress.  Her work focused on landscapes, particularly depictions of sheep.   

She attended Lindenwood College in St. Charles, Missouri and the St. Louis School of Fine Arts.  She married one of her instructors at the latter school, the painter John Hemming Fry, in 1891.  The couple moved to Paris, where she studied under a number of artists, including Harry Thompson, Aime Morot, Jean-Charles Cazin, and August Friedrich Schenck. 

In 1916, the Frys, along with painter Lawton S. Parker, founded Rodin Studios, a cooperative apartment building intended to provide housing and studio space for artists.  The building, designed by Cass Gilbert, opened the next year, with the Frys occupying a large apartment on the top floor.

While on a trip to Beijing with a friend, Georgia Timken Fry died of the bubonic plague on 8 September 1921.

References 

Created via preloaddraft
1864 births
1921 deaths
American women painters
Landscape painters